Jake Smith (born 19 May 1998) is a British long-distance runner. In 2020, he competed in the men's race at the 2020 World Athletics Half Marathon Championships held in Gdynia, Poland.

In 2019, he finished in 8th place in the men's 10,000 metres event at the 2019 European Athletics U23 Championships held in Gävle, Sweden.

In April 2021 he ran his first full marathon in a time of 2:11:00 having originally planned to run as a pacer competing only part of the course.

References

External links 
 

Living people
1998 births
Place of birth missing (living people)
British male long-distance runners
21st-century British people